Hans Wagner is a West German bobsledder who competed in the late 1970s. He won the gold medal in the four-man event at the 1979 FIBT World Championships in Königssee.

Wagner also finished seventh in the four-man event at the 1980 Winter Olympics in Lake Placid, New York.

References
Bobsleigh four-man world championship medalists since 1930
Wallenchinsky, David (1984). "Bobsled: Four-man". In The Complete Book of the Olympics: 1896 - 1980. New York: Penguin Books. p. 562.

Bobsledders at the 1980 Winter Olympics
German male bobsledders
Living people
Year of birth missing (living people)
Olympic bobsledders of West Germany